Coleophora pastranai is a moth of the family Coleophoridae that is endemic to Argentina.

References

External links

pastranai
Endemic fauna of Argentina
Moths described in 1999
Moths of South America